{{Infobox person
| name               = Akira Kurosawa
| honorific_suffix   = Junior Third Rank
| image              = Akirakurosawa-onthesetof7samurai-1953-page88.jpg
| caption            = Kurosawa on the set of Seven Samurai in December 1953
| native_name        = 
| birth_date         = 
| birth_place        = Shinagawa, Tokyo, Empire of Japan
| death_date         = 
| death_place        = Setagaya, Tokyo, Japan
| resting_place      = An'yō-in, Kamakura, Kanagawa, Japan
| occupation         = 
| years_active       = 1936–1993
| notable_works      = {{ubl| Drunken Angel (1948)Rashomon (1950)| (1952)|Seven Samurai (1954)|Throne of Blood (1957)|The Hidden Fortress (1958)|Yojimbo (1961)| (1980)| (1985)}}
| height             = 182 cm
| spouse             = 
| children           = Hisao (b. 1945–) and Kazuko (b. 1954–)
| signature          = KurosawaSignature.png
| awards             = 
| module             = 
}}

 was a Japanese filmmaker and painter who directed thirty films in a career spanning over five decades. He is widely regarded as one of the most important and influential filmmakers in the history of cinema. Kurosawa displayed a bold, dynamic style, strongly influenced by Western cinema yet distinct from it; he was involved with all aspects of film production.

Kurosawa entered the Japanese film industry in 1936, following a brief stint as a painter. After years of working on numerous films as an assistant director and scriptwriter, he made his debut as a director during World War II with the popular action film Sanshiro Sugata (1943). After the war, the critically acclaimed Drunken Angel (1948), in which Kurosawa cast the then little-known actor Toshiro Mifune in a starring role, cemented the director's reputation as one of the most important young filmmakers in Japan. The two men would go on to collaborate on another fifteen films.Rashomon (1950), which premiered in Tokyo, became the surprise winner of the Golden Lion at the 1951 Venice Film Festival. The commercial and critical success of that film opened up Western film markets for the first time to the products of the Japanese film industry, which in turn led to international recognition for other Japanese filmmakers.

In 1990, he accepted the Academy Award for Lifetime Achievement. Posthumously, he was named "Asian of the Century" in the "Arts, Literature, and Culture" category by AsianWeek magazine and CNN, cited there as being among the five people who most prominently contributed to the improvement of Asia in the 20th century. His career has been honored by many retrospectives, critical studies and biographies in both print and video, and by releases in many consumer media.

 Biography 
 Childhood to war years (1910–1945) 
 Childhood and youth (1910–1935) 
Kurosawa was born on March 23, 1910, in Ōimachi in the Ōmori district of Tokyo. His father Isamu (1864–1948), a member of a samurai family from Akita Prefecture, worked as the director of the Army's Physical Education Institute's lower secondary school, while his mother Shima (1870–1952) came from a merchant's family living in Osaka. Akira was the eighth and youngest child of the moderately wealthy family, with two of his siblings already grown up at the time of his birth and one deceased, leaving Kurosawa to grow up with three sisters and a brother.

In addition to promoting physical exercise, Isamu Kurosawa was open to Western traditions and considered theatre and motion pictures to have educational merit. He encouraged his children to watch films; young Akira viewed his first movies at the age of six. An important formative influence was his elementary school teacher Mr. Tachikawa, whose progressive educational practices ignited in his young pupil first a love of drawing and then an interest in education in general. During this time, the boy also studied calligraphy and Kendo swordsmanship.

Another major childhood influence was Heigo Kurosawa (1906-1933), Akira's older brother by four years. In the aftermath of the Great Kantō earthquake and the Kantō Massacre of 1923, Heigo took the thirteen-year-old Akira to view the devastation. When the younger brother wanted to look away from the corpses of humans and animals scattered everywhere, Heigo forbade him to do so, encouraging Akira instead to face his fears by confronting them directly. Some commentators have suggested that this incident would influence Kurosawa's later artistic career, as the director was seldom hesitant to confront unpleasant truths in his work.

Heigo was academically gifted, but soon after failing to secure a place in Tokyo's foremost high school, he began to detach himself from the rest of the family, preferring to concentrate on his interest in foreign literature. In the late 1920s, Heigo became a benshi (silent film narrator) for Tokyo theaters showing foreign films and quickly made a name for himself. Akira, who at this point planned to become a painter, moved in with him, and the two brothers became inseparable. With Heigo's guidance, Akira devoured not only films but also theater and circus performances, while exhibiting his paintings and working for the left-wing Proletarian Artists' League. However, he was never able to make a living with his art, and, as he began to perceive most of the proletarian movement as "putting unfulfilled political ideals directly onto the canvas", he lost his enthusiasm for painting.

With the increasing production of talking pictures in the early 1930s, film narrators like Heigo began to lose work, and Akira moved back in with his parents. In July 1933, Heigo died by suicide. Kurosawa has commented on the lasting sense of loss he felt at his brother's death and the chapter of his autobiography (Something Like an Autobiography) that describes it—written nearly half a century after the event—is titled, "A Story I Don't Want to Tell". Only four months later, Kurosawa's eldest brother also died, leaving Akira, at age 23, the only one of the Kurosawa brothers still living, together with his three surviving sisters.

 Director in training (1935–1941) 

In 1935, the new film studio Photo Chemical Laboratories, known as P.C.L. (which later became the major studio Toho), advertised for assistant directors. Although he had demonstrated no previous interest in film as a profession, Kurosawa submitted the required essay, which asked applicants to discuss the fundamental deficiencies of Japanese films and find ways to overcome them. His half-mocking view was that if the deficiencies were fundamental, there was no way to correct them. Kurosawa's essay earned him a call to take the follow-up exams, and director Kajirō Yamamoto, who was among the examiners, took a liking to Kurosawa and insisted that the studio hire him. The 25-year-old Kurosawa joined P.C.L. in February 1936.

During his five years as an assistant director, Kurosawa worked under numerous directors, but by far the most important figure in his development was Yamamoto. Of his 24 films as A.D., he worked on 17 under Yamamoto, many of them comedies featuring the popular actor Ken'ichi Enomoto, known as "Enoken". Yamamoto nurtured Kurosawa's talent, promoting him directly from third assistant director to chief assistant director after a year. Kurosawa's responsibilities increased, and he worked at tasks ranging from stage construction and film development to location scouting, script polishing, rehearsals, lighting, dubbing, editing, and second-unit directing. In the last of Kurosawa's films as an assistant director for Yamamoto, Horse (1941), Kurosawa took over most of the production, as his mentor was occupied with the shooting of another film.

Yamamoto advised Kurosawa that a good director needed to master screenwriting. Kurosawa soon realized that the potential earnings from his scripts were much higher than what he was paid as an assistant director. He later wrote or co-wrote all his films, and frequently penned screenplays for other directors such as Satsuo Yamamoto's film, A Triumph of Wings (Tsubasa no gaika, 1942). This outside scriptwriting would serve Kurosawa as a lucrative sideline lasting well into the 1960s, long after he became famous.

 Wartime films and marriage (1942–1945) 
In the two years following the release of Horse in 1941, Kurosawa searched for a story he could use to launch his directing career. Towards the end of 1942, about a year after the Japanese attack on Pearl Harbor, novelist Tsuneo Tomita published his Musashi Miyamoto-inspired judo novel, Sanshiro Sugata, the advertisements for which intrigued Kurosawa. He bought the book on its publication day, devoured it in one sitting, and immediately asked Toho to secure the film rights. Kurosawa's initial instinct proved correct as, within a few days, three other major Japanese studios also offered to buy the rights. Toho prevailed, and Kurosawa began pre-production on his debut work as director.

Shooting of Sanshiro Sugata began on location in Yokohama in December 1942. Production proceeded smoothly, but getting the completed film past the censors was an entirely different matter. The censorship office considered the work to be objectionably "British-American" by the standards of wartime Japan, and it was only through the intervention of director Yasujirō Ozu, who championed the film, that Sanshiro Sugata was finally accepted for release on March 25, 1943. (Kurosawa had just turned 33.) The movie became both a critical and commercial success. Nevertheless, the censorship office would later decide to cut out some 18 minutes of footage, much of which is now considered lost.

He next turned to the subject of wartime female factory workers in The Most Beautiful, a propaganda film which he shot in a semi-documentary style in early 1944. To elicit realistic performances from his actresses, the director had them live in a real factory during the shoot, eat the factory food and call each other by their character names. He would use similar methods with his performers throughout his career.

During production, the actress playing the leader of the factory workers, Yōko Yaguchi, was chosen by her colleagues to present their demands to the director. She and Kurosawa were constantly at odds, and it was through these arguments that the two paradoxically became close. They married on May 21, 1945, with Yaguchi two months pregnant (she never resumed her acting career), and the couple would remain together until her death in 1985. They had two children, both surviving Kurosawa : a son, Hisao, born December 20, 1945, who served as producer on some of his father's last projects, and Kazuko, a daughter, born April 29, 1954, who became a costume designer.

Shortly before his marriage, Kurosawa was pressured by the studio against his will to direct a sequel to his debut film. The often blatantly propagandistic Sanshiro Sugata Part II, which premiered in May 1945, is generally considered one of his weakest pictures.

Kurosawa decided to write the script for a film that would be both censor-friendly and less expensive to produce. The Men Who Tread on the Tiger's Tail, based on the Kabuki play Kanjinchō and starring the comedian Enoken, with whom Kurosawa had often worked during his assistant director days, was completed in September 1945. By this time, Japan had surrendered and the occupation of Japan had begun. The new American censors interpreted the values allegedly promoted in the picture as overly "feudal" and banned the work. It was not released until 1952, the year another Kurosawa film, was also released. Ironically, while in production, the film had already been savaged by Japanese wartime censors as too Western and "democratic" (they particularly disliked the comic porter played by Enoken), so the movie most probably would not have seen the light of day even if the war had continued beyond its completion.

 Early postwar years to Red Beard (1946–1965) 
 First postwar works (1946–1950) 
After the war, Kurosawa, influenced by the democratic ideals of the Occupation, sought to make films that would establish a new respect towards the individual and the self. The first such film, No Regrets for Our Youth (1946), inspired by both the 1933 Takigawa incident and the Hotsumi Ozaki wartime spy case, criticized Japan's prewar regime for its political oppression. Atypically for the director, the heroic central character is a woman, Yukie (Setsuko Hara), who, born into upper-middle-class privilege, comes to question her values in a time of political crisis. The original script had to be extensively rewritten and, because of its controversial theme and gender of its protagonist, the completed work divided critics. Nevertheless, it managed to win the approval of audiences, who turned variations on the film's title into a postwar catchphrase.

His next film, One Wonderful Sunday premiered in July 1947 to mixed reviews. It is a relatively uncomplicated and sentimental love story dealing with an impoverished postwar couple trying to enjoy, within the devastation of postwar Tokyo, their one weekly day off. The movie bears the influence of Frank Capra, D. W. Griffith and F. W. Murnau, each of whom was among Kurosawa's favorite directors. Another film released in 1947 with Kurosawa's involvement was the action-adventure thriller, Snow Trail, directed by Senkichi Taniguchi from Kurosawa's screenplay. It marked the debut of the intense young actor Toshiro Mifune. It was Kurosawa who, with his mentor Yamamoto, had intervened to persuade Toho to sign Mifune, during an audition in which the young man greatly impressed Kurosawa, but managed to alienate most of the other judges.Drunken Angel is often considered the director's first major work. Although the script, like all of Kurosawa's occupation-era works, had to go through rewrites due to American censorship, Kurosawa felt that this was the first film in which he was able to express himself freely. A gritty story of a doctor who tries to save a gangster (yakuza) with tuberculosis, it was also the first time that Kurosawa directed Mifune, who went on to play major roles in all but one of the director's next 16 films (the exception being ). While Mifune was not cast as the protagonist in Drunken Angel, his explosive performance as the gangster so dominates the drama that he shifted the focus from the title character, the alcoholic doctor played by Takashi Shimura, who had already appeared in several Kurosawa movies. However, Kurosawa did not want to smother the young actor's immense vitality, and Mifune's rebellious character electrified audiences in much the way that Marlon Brando's defiant stance would startle American film audiences a few years later. The film premiered in Tokyo in April 1948 to rave reviews and was chosen by the prestigious Kinema Junpo critics poll as the best film of its year, the first of three Kurosawa movies to be so honored.

Kurosawa, with producer Sōjirō Motoki and fellow directors and friends Kajiro Yamamoto, Mikio Naruse and Senkichi Taniguchi, formed a new independent production unit called Film Art Association (Eiga Geijutsu Kyōkai). For this organization's debut work, and first film for Daiei studios, Kurosawa turned to a contemporary play by Kazuo Kikuta and, together with Taniguchi, adapted it for the screen. The Quiet Duel starred Toshiro Mifune as an idealistic young doctor struggling with syphilis, a deliberate attempt by Kurosawa to break the actor away from being typecast as gangsters. Released in March 1949, it was a box office success, but is generally considered one of the director's lesser achievements.

His second film of 1949, also produced by Film Art Association and released by Shintoho, was Stray Dog. It is a detective movie (perhaps the first important Japanese film in that genre) that explores the mood of Japan during its painful postwar recovery through the story of a young detective, played by Mifune, and his fixation on the recovery of his handgun, which was stolen by a penniless war veteran who proceeds to use it to rob and murder. Adapted from an unpublished novel by Kurosawa in the style of a favorite writer of his, Georges Simenon, it was the director's first collaboration with screenwriter Ryuzo Kikushima, who would later help to script eight other Kurosawa films. A famous, virtually wordless sequence, lasting over eight minutes, shows the detective, disguised as an impoverished veteran, wandering the streets in search of the gun thief; it employed actual documentary footage of war-ravaged Tokyo neighborhoods shot by Kurosawa's friend, Ishirō Honda, the future director of Godzilla. The film is considered a precursor to the contemporary police procedural and buddy cop film genres.Scandal, released by Shochiku in April 1950, was inspired by the director's personal experiences with, and anger towards, Japanese yellow journalism. The work is an ambitious mixture of courtroom drama and social problem film about free speech and personal responsibility, but even Kurosawa regarded the finished product as dramatically unfocused and unsatisfactory, and almost all critics agree. However, it would be Kurosawa's second film of 1950, Rashomon, that would ultimately win him, and Japanese cinema, a whole new international audience.

 International recognition (1950–1958) 
After finishing Scandal, Kurosawa was approached by Daiei studios to make another film for them. Kurosawa picked a script by an aspiring young screenwriter, Shinobu Hashimoto, who would eventually work on nine of his films. Their first joint effort was based on Ryūnosuke Akutagawa's experimental short story "In a Grove", which recounts the murder of a samurai and the rape of his wife from various different and conflicting points-of-view. Kurosawa saw potential in the script, and with Hashimoto's help, polished and expanded it and then pitched it to Daiei, who were happy to accept the project due to its low budget.

The shooting of Rashomon began on July 7, 1950, and, after extensive location work in the primeval forest of Nara, wrapped on August 17. Just one week was spent in hurried post-production, hampered by a studio fire, and the finished film premiered at Tokyo's Imperial Theatre on August 25, expanding nationwide the following day. The movie was met by lukewarm reviews, with many critics puzzled by its unique theme and treatment, but it was nevertheless a moderate financial success for Daiei.

Kurosawa's next film, for Shochiku, was The Idiot, an adaptation of the novel by the director's favorite writer, Fyodor Dostoevsky. The story is relocated from Russia to Hokkaido, but otherwise adheres closely to the original, a fact seen by many critics as detrimental to the work. A studio-mandated edit shortened it from Kurosawa's original cut of 265 minutes to just 166 minutes, making the resulting narrative exceedingly difficult to follow. The severely edited film version is widely considered to be one of the director's least successful works and the original full-length version no longer exists. Contemporary reviews of the much shortened edited version were very negative, but the film was a moderate success at the box office, largely because of the popularity of one of its stars, Setsuko Hara.

Meanwhile, unbeknownst to Kurosawa, Rashomon had been entered in the Venice Film Festival, due to the efforts of Giuliana Stramigioli, a Japan-based representative of an Italian film company, who had seen and admired the movie and convinced Daiei to submit it. On September 10, 1951, Rashomon was awarded the festival's highest prize, the Golden Lion, shocking not only Daiei but the international film world, which at the time was largely unaware of Japan's decades-old cinematic tradition.

After Daiei briefly exhibited a subtitled print of the film in Los Angeles, RKO purchased distribution rights to Rashomon in the United States. The company was taking a considerable gamble. It had put out only one prior subtitled film in the American market, and the only previous Japanese talkie commercially released in New York had been Mikio Naruse's comedy, Wife! Be Like a Rose!, in 1937: a critical and box-office flop. However, Rashomons commercial run, greatly helped by strong reviews from critics and even the columnist Ed Sullivan, earned $35,000 in its first three weeks at a single New York theatre, an almost unheard-of sum at the time.

This success in turn led to a vogue in America and the West for Japanese movies throughout the 1950s, replacing the enthusiasm for Italian neorealist cinema. By the end of 1952 Rashomon was released in Japan, the United States, and most of Europe. Among the Japanese film-makers whose work, as a result, began to win festival prizes and commercial release in the West were Kenji Mizoguchi (The Life of Oharu, Ugetsu, Sansho the Bailiff) and, somewhat later, Yasujirō Ozu (Tokyo Story, An Autumn Afternoon)—artists highly respected in Japan but, before this period, almost totally unknown in the West. Kurosawa's growing reputation among Western audiences in the 1950s would make Western audiences more sympathetic to the reception of later generations of Japanese film-makers ranging from Kon Ichikawa, Masaki Kobayashi, Nagisa Oshima and Shohei Imamura to Juzo Itami, Takeshi Kitano and Takashi Miike.

His career boosted by his sudden international fame, Kurosawa, now reunited with his original film studio, Toho (which would go on to produce his next 11 films), set to work on his next project, . The movie stars Takashi Shimura as a cancer-ridden Tokyo bureaucrat, Watanabe, on a final quest for meaning before his death. For the screenplay, Kurosawa brought in Hashimoto as well as writer Hideo Oguni, who would go on to co-write twelve Kurosawa films. Despite the work's grim subject matter, the screenwriters took a satirical approach, which some have compared to the work of Brecht, to both the bureaucratic world of its hero and the U.S. cultural colonization of Japan. (American pop songs figure prominently in the film.) Because of this strategy, the filmmakers are usually credited with saving the picture from the kind of sentimentality common to dramas about characters with terminal illnesses.  opened in October 1952 to rave reviews—it won Kurosawa his second Kinema Junpo "Best Film" award—and enormous box office success. It remains the most acclaimed of all the artist's films set in the modern era.

In December 1952, Kurosawa took his  screenwriters, Shinobu Hashimoto and Hideo Oguni, for a forty-five-day secluded residence at an inn to create the screenplay for his next movie, Seven Samurai. The ensemble work was Kurosawa's first proper samurai film, the genre for which he would become most famous. The simple story, about a poor farming village in Sengoku period Japan that hires a group of samurai to defend it against an impending attack by bandits, was given a full epic treatment, with a huge cast (largely consisting of veterans of previous Kurosawa productions) and meticulously detailed action, stretching out to almost three-and-a-half hours of screen time.

Three months were spent in pre-production and a month in rehearsals. Shooting took up 148 days spread over almost a year, interrupted by production and financing troubles and Kurosawa's health problems. The film finally opened in April 1954, half a year behind its original release date and about three times over budget, making it at the time the most expensive Japanese film ever made. (However, by Hollywood standards, it was a quite modestly budgeted production, even for that time.) The film received positive critical reaction and became a big hit, quickly making back the money invested in it and providing the studio with a product that they could, and did, market internationally—though with extensive edits. Over time—and with the theatrical and home video releases of the uncut version—its reputation has steadily grown. It is now regarded by some commentators as the greatest Japanese film ever made, and in 1999, a poll of Japanese film critics also voted it the best Japanese film ever made. In the most recent (2012) version of the widely respected British Film Institute (BFI) Sight & Sound "Greatest Films of All Time" poll, Seven Samurai placed 17th among all films from all countries in both the critics' and the directors' polls, receiving a place in the Top Ten lists of 48 critics and 22 directors.

In 1954, nuclear tests in the Pacific were causing radioactive rainstorms in Japan and one particular incident in March had exposed a Japanese fishing boat to nuclear fallout, with disastrous results. It is in this anxious atmosphere that Kurosawa's next film, I Live in Fear, was conceived. The story concerned an elderly factory owner (Toshiro Mifune) so terrified of the prospect of a nuclear attack that he becomes determined to move his entire extended family (both legal and extra-marital) to what he imagines is the safety of a farm in Brazil. Production went much more smoothly than the director's previous film, but a few days before shooting ended, Kurosawa's composer, collaborator, and close friend Fumio Hayasaka died (of tuberculosis) at the age of 41. The film's score was finished by Hayasaka's student, Masaru Sato, who would go on to score all of Kurosawa's next eight films. I Live in Fear opened in November 1955 to mixed reviews and muted audience reaction, becoming the first Kurosawa film to lose money during its original theatrical run. Today, it is considered by many to be among the finest films dealing with the psychological effects of the global nuclear stalemate.

Kurosawa's next project, Throne of Blood, an adaptation of William Shakespeare's Macbeth—set, like Seven Samurai, in the Sengoku Era—represented an ambitious transposition of the English work into a Japanese context. Kurosawa instructed his leading actress, Isuzu Yamada, to regard the work as if it were a cinematic version of a Japanese rather than a European literary classic. Given Kurosawa's appreciation of traditional Japanese stage acting, the acting of the players, particularly Yamada, draws heavily on the stylized techniques of the Noh theater. It was filmed in 1956 and released in January 1957 to a slightly less negative domestic response than had been the case with the director's previous film. Abroad, Throne of Blood, regardless of the liberties it takes with its source material, quickly earned a place among the most celebrated Shakespeare adaptations.

Another adaptation of a classic European theatrical work followed almost immediately, with production of The Lower Depths, based on a play by Maxim Gorky, taking place in May and June 1957. In contrast to the Shakespearean sweep of Throne of Blood, The Lower Depths was shot on only two confined sets, in order to emphasize the restricted nature of the characters' lives. Though faithful to the play, this adaptation of Russian material to a completely Japanese setting—in this case, the late Edo period—unlike his earlier The Idiot, was regarded as artistically successful. The film premiered in September 1957, receiving a mixed response similar to that of Throne of Blood. However, some critics rank it among the director's most underrated works.

Kurosawa's three next movies after Seven Samurai had not managed to capture Japanese audiences in the way that that film had. The mood of the director's work had been growing increasingly pessimistic and dark even as Japan entered a boom period of high-speed growth and rising standards of living. Out of step with the prevailing mood of the era, Kurosawa's films questioned the possibility of redemption through personal responsibility, particularly in Throne of Blood and The Lower Depths. He recognized this, and deliberately aimed for a more light-hearted and entertaining film for his next production while switching to the new widescreen format that had been gaining popularity in Japan. The resulting film, The Hidden Fortress, is an action-adventure comedy-drama about a medieval princess, her loyal general, and two peasants who all need to travel through enemy lines in order to reach their home region. Released in December 1958, The Hidden Fortress became an enormous box-office success in Japan and was warmly received by critics both in Japan and abroad. Today, the film is considered one of Kurosawa's most lightweight efforts, though it remains popular, not least because it is one of several major influences on George Lucas's 1977 space opera, Star Wars.

 Birth of a company and Red Beard (1959–1965) 
Starting with Rashomon, Kurosawa's productions had become increasingly large in scope and so had the director's budgets. Toho, concerned about this development, suggested that he might help finance his own works, therefore making the studio's potential losses smaller, while in turn allowing himself more artistic freedom as co-producer. Kurosawa agreed, and the Kurosawa Production Company was established in April 1959, with Toho as the majority shareholder.

Despite risking his own money, Kurosawa chose a story that was more directly critical of the Japanese business and political elites than any previous work. The Bad Sleep Well, based on a script by Kurosawa's nephew Mike Inoue, is a revenge drama about a young man who is able to infiltrate the hierarchy of a corrupt Japanese company with the intention of exposing the men responsible for his father's death. Its theme proved topical: while the film was in production, the massive Anpo protests were held against the new U.S.–Japan Security treaty, which was seen by many Japanese, particularly the young, as threatening the country's democracy by giving too much power to corporations and politicians. The film opened in September 1960 to positive critical reaction and modest box office success. The 25-minute opening sequence depicting a corporate wedding reception is widely regarded as one of Kurosawa's most skillfully executed set pieces, but the remainder of the film is often perceived as disappointing by comparison. The movie has also been criticized for employing the conventional Kurosawan hero to combat a social evil that cannot be resolved through the actions of individuals, however courageous or cunning.Yojimbo (The Bodyguard), Kurosawa Production's second film, centers on a masterless samurai, Sanjuro, who strolls into a 19th-century town ruled by two opposing violent factions and provokes them into destroying each other. The director used this work to play with many genre conventions, particularly the Western, while at the same time offering an unprecedentedly (for the Japanese screen) graphic portrayal of violence. Some commentators have seen the Sanjuro character in this film as a fantasy figure who magically reverses the historical triumph of the corrupt merchant class over the samurai class. Featuring Tatsuya Nakadai in his first major role in a Kurosawa movie, and with innovative photography by Kazuo Miyagawa (who shot Rashomon) and Takao Saito, the film premiered in April 1961 and was a critically and commercially successful venture, earning more than any previous Kurosawa film. The movie and its blackly comic tone were also widely imitated abroad. Sergio Leone's A Fistful of Dollars was a virtual (unauthorized) scene-by-scene remake with Toho filing a lawsuit on Kurosawa's behalf and prevailing.

Following the success of Yojimbo, Kurosawa found himself under pressure from Toho to create a sequel. Kurosawa turned to a script he had written before Yojimbo, reworking it to include the hero of his previous film. Sanjuro was the first of three Kurosawa films to be adapted from the work of the writer Shūgorō Yamamoto (the others would be Red Beard and Dodeskaden). It is lighter in tone and closer to a conventional period film than Yojimbo, though its story of a power struggle within a samurai clan is portrayed with strongly comic undertones. The film opened on January 1, 1962, quickly surpassing Yojimbos box office success and garnering positive reviews.

Kurosawa had meanwhile instructed Toho to purchase the film rights to King's Ransom, a novel about a kidnapping written by American author and screenwriter Evan Hunter, under his pseudonym of Ed McBain, as one of his 87th Precinct series of crime books. The director intended to create a work condemning kidnapping, which he considered one of the very worst crimes. The suspense film, titled High and Low, was shot during the latter half of 1962 and released in March 1963. It broke Kurosawa's box office record (the third film in a row to do so), became the highest grossing Japanese film of the year, and won glowing reviews. However, his triumph was somewhat tarnished when, ironically, the film was blamed for a wave of kidnappings which occurred in Japan about this time (he himself received kidnapping threats directed at his young daughter, Kazuko). High and Low is considered by many commentators to be among the director's strongest works.

Kurosawa quickly moved on to his next project, Red Beard. Based on a short story collection by Shūgorō Yamamoto and incorporating elements from Dostoevsky's novel The Insulted and Injured, it is a period film, set in a mid-nineteenth century clinic for the poor, in which Kurosawa's humanist themes receive perhaps their fullest statement. A conceited and materialistic, foreign-trained young doctor, Yasumoto, is forced to become an intern at the clinic under the stern tutelage of Doctor Niide, known as "Akahige" ("Red Beard"), played by Mifune. Although he resists Red Beard initially, Yasumoto comes to admire his wisdom and courage and to perceive the patients at the clinic, whom he at first despised, as worthy of compassion and dignity.

Yūzō Kayama, who plays Yasumoto, was an extremely popular film and music star at the time, particularly for his "Young Guy" (Wakadaishō) series of musical comedies, so signing him to appear in the film virtually guaranteed Kurosawa strong box-office. The shoot, the filmmaker's longest ever, lasted well over a year (after five months of pre-production), and wrapped in spring 1965, leaving the director, his crew and his actors exhausted. Red Beard premiered in April 1965, becoming the year's highest-grossing Japanese production and the third (and last) Kurosawa film to top the prestigious Kinema Jumpo yearly critics poll. It remains one of Kurosawa's best-known and most-loved works in his native country. Outside Japan, critics have been much more divided. Most commentators concede its technical merits and some praise it as among Kurosawa's best, while others insist that it lacks complexity and genuine narrative power, with still others claiming that it represents a retreat from the artist's previous commitment to social and political change.

The film marked something of an end of an era for its creator. The director himself recognized this at the time of its release, telling critic Donald Richie that a cycle of some kind had just come to an end and that his future films and production methods would be different. His prediction proved quite accurate. Beginning in the late 1950s, television began increasingly to dominate the leisure time of the formerly large and loyal Japanese cinema audience. And as film company revenues dropped, so did their appetite for risk—particularly the risk represented by Kurosawa's costly production methods.Red Beard also marked the midway point, chronologically, in the artist's career. During his previous twenty-nine years in the film industry (which includes his five years as assistant director), he had directed twenty-three films, while during the remaining twenty-eight years, for many complex reasons, he would complete only seven more. Also, for reasons never adequately explained, Red Beard would be his final film starring Toshiro Mifune. Yū Fujiki, an actor who worked on The Lower Depths, observed, regarding the closeness of the two men on the set, "Mr. Kurosawa's heart was in Mr. Mifune's body." Donald Richie has described the rapport between them as a unique "symbiosis".

 Hollywood ambitions to last films (1966–1998) 
 Hollywood detour (1966–1968) 
When Kurosawa's exclusive contract with Toho came to an end in 1966, the 56-year-old director was seriously contemplating change. Observing the troubled state of the domestic film industry, and having already received dozens of offers from abroad, the idea of working outside Japan appealed to him as never before.

For his first foreign project, Kurosawa chose a story based on a Life magazine article. The Embassy Pictures action thriller, to be filmed in English and called simply Runaway Train, would have been his first in color. But the language barrier proved a major problem, and the English version of the screenplay was not even finished by the time filming was to begin in autumn 1966. The shoot, which required snow, was moved to autumn 1967, then canceled in 1968. Almost two decades later, another foreign director working in Hollywood, Andrei Konchalovsky, finally made Runaway Train (1985), though from a new script loosely based on Kurosawa's.

The director meanwhile had become involved in a much more ambitious Hollywood project. Tora! Tora! Tora!, produced by 20th Century Fox and Kurosawa Production, would be a portrayal of the Japanese attack on Pearl Harbor from both the American and the Japanese points of view, with Kurosawa helming the Japanese half and an Anglophonic film-maker directing the American half. He spent several months working on the script with Ryuzo Kikushima and Hideo Oguni, but very soon the project began to unravel. The director of the American sequences turned out not to be David Lean, as originally planned, but American Richard Fleischer. The budget was also cut, and the screen time allocated for the Japanese segment would now be no longer than 90 minutes—a major problem, considering that Kurosawa's script ran over four hours. After numerous revisions with the direct involvement of Darryl Zanuck, a more or less finalized cut screenplay was agreed upon in May 1968.

Shooting began in early December, but Kurosawa would last only a little over three weeks as director. He struggled to work with an unfamiliar crew and the requirements of a Hollywood production, while his working methods puzzled his American producers, who ultimately concluded that the director must be mentally ill. Kurosawa was examined at Kyoto University Hospital by a neuropsychologist, Dr. Murakami, whose diagnosis was forwarded to Darryl Zanuck and Richard Zanuck at Fox studios indicating a diagnosis of neurasthenia stating that, "He is suffering from disturbance of sleep, agitated with feelings of anxiety and in manic excitement caused by the above mentioned illness. It is necessary for him to have rest and medical treatment for more than two months." On Christmas Eve 1968, the Americans announced that Kurosawa had left the production due to "fatigue", effectively firing him. He was ultimately replaced, for the film's Japanese sequences, with two directors, Kinji Fukasaku and Toshio Masuda.Tora! Tora! Tora!, finally released to unenthusiastic reviews in September 1970, was, as Donald Richie put it, an "almost unmitigated tragedy" in Kurosawa's career. He had spent years of his life on a logistically nightmarish project to which he ultimately did not contribute a foot of film shot by himself. (He had his name removed from the credits, though the script used for the Japanese half was still his and his co-writers'.) He became estranged from his longtime collaborator, writer Ryuzo Kikushima, and never worked with him again. The project had inadvertently exposed corruption in his own production company (a situation reminiscent of his own movie, The Bad Sleep Well). His very sanity had been called into question. Worst of all, the Japanese film industry—and perhaps the man himself—began to suspect that he would never make another film.

 A difficult decade (1969–1977) 
Knowing that his reputation was at stake following the much publicised Tora! Tora! Tora! debacle, Kurosawa moved quickly to a new project to prove he was still viable. To his aid came friends and famed directors Keisuke Kinoshita, Masaki Kobayashi and Kon Ichikawa, who together with Kurosawa established in July 1969 a production company called the Club of the Four Knights (Yonki no kai). Although the plan was for the four directors to create a film each, it has been suggested that the real motivation for the other three directors was to make it easier for Kurosawa to successfully complete a film, and therefore find his way back into the business.

The first project proposed and worked on was a period film to be called Dora-heita, but when this was deemed too expensive, attention shifted to Dodesukaden, an adaptation of yet another Shūgorō Yamamoto work, again about the poor and destitute. The film was shot quickly (by Kurosawa's standards) in about nine weeks, with Kurosawa determined to show he was still capable of working quickly and efficiently within a limited budget. For his first work in color, the dynamic editing and complex compositions of his earlier pictures were set aside, with the artist focusing on the creation of a bold, almost surreal palette of primary colors, in order to reveal the toxic environment in which the characters live. It was released in Japan in October 1970, but though a minor critical success, it was greeted with audience indifference. The picture lost money and caused the Club of the Four Knights to dissolve. Initial reception abroad was somewhat more favorable, but Dodesukaden has since been typically considered an interesting experiment not comparable to the director's best work.

After struggling through the production of Dodesukaden, Kurosawa turned to television work the following year for the only time in his career with Song of the Horse, a documentary about thoroughbred race horses. It featured a voice-over narrated by a fictional man and a child (voiced by the same actors as the beggar and his son in Dodesukaden). It is the only documentary in Kurosawa's filmography; the small crew included his frequent collaborator Masaru Sato, who composed the music. Song of the Horse is also unique in Kurosawa's oeuvre in that it includes an editor's credit, suggesting that it is the only Kurosawa film that he did not cut himself.

Unable to secure funding for further work and allegedly having health problems, Kurosawa apparently reached the breaking point: on December 22, 1971, he slit his wrists and throat multiple times. The suicide attempt proved unsuccessful and the director's health recovered fairly quickly, with Kurosawa now taking refuge in domestic life, uncertain if he would ever direct another film.

In early 1973, the Soviet studio Mosfilm approached the film-maker to ask if he would be interested in working with them. Kurosawa proposed an adaptation of Russian explorer Vladimir Arsenyev's autobiographical work Dersu Uzala. The book, about a Goldi hunter who lives in harmony with nature until destroyed by encroaching civilization, was one that he had wanted to make since the 1930s. In December 1973, the 63-year-old Kurosawa set off for the Soviet Union with four of his closest aides, beginning a year-and-a-half stay in the country. Shooting began in May 1974 in Siberia, with filming in exceedingly harsh natural conditions proving very difficult and demanding. The picture wrapped in April 1975, with a thoroughly exhausted and homesick Kurosawa returning to Japan and his family in June. Dersu Uzala had its world premiere in Japan on August 2, 1975, and did well at the box office. While critical reception in Japan was muted, the film was better reviewed abroad, winning the Golden Prize at the 9th Moscow International Film Festival, as well as an Academy Award for Best Foreign Language Film. Today, critics remain divided over the film: some see it as an example of Kurosawa's alleged artistic decline, while others count it among his finest works.

Although proposals for television projects were submitted to him, he had no interest in working outside the film world. Nevertheless, the hard-drinking director did agree to appear in a series of television ads for Suntory whiskey, which aired in 1976. While fearing that he might never be able to make another film, the director nevertheless continued working on various projects, writing scripts and creating detailed illustrations, intending to leave behind a visual record of his plans in case he would never be able to film his stories.

 Two epics (1978–1986) 
In 1977, American director George Lucas released Star Wars, a wildly successful science fiction film influenced by Kurosawa's The Hidden Fortress, among other works. Lucas, like many other New Hollywood directors, revered Kurosawa and considered him a role model, and was shocked to discover that the Japanese film-maker was unable to secure financing for any new work. The two met in San Francisco in July 1978 to discuss the project Kurosawa considered most financially viable: , the epic story of a thief hired as the double of a medieval Japanese lord of a great clan. Lucas, enthralled by the screenplay and Kurosawa's illustrations, leveraged his influence over 20th Century Fox to coerce the studio that had fired Kurosawa just ten years earlier to produce , then recruited fellow fan Francis Ford Coppola as co-producer.

Production began the following April, with Kurosawa in high spirits. Shooting lasted from June 1979 through March 1980 and was plagued with problems, not the least of which was the firing of the original lead actor, Shintaro Katsu—creator of the very popular Zatoichi character—due to an incident in which the actor insisted, against the director's wishes, on videotaping his own performance. (He was replaced by Tatsuya Nakadai, in his first of two consecutive leading roles in a Kurosawa movie.) The film was completed only a few weeks behind schedule and opened in Tokyo in April 1980. It quickly became a massive hit in Japan. The film was also a critical and box office success abroad, winning the coveted Palme d'Or at the 1980 Cannes Film Festival in May, though some critics, then and now, have faulted the film for its alleged coldness. Kurosawa spent much of the rest of the year in Europe and America promoting , collecting awards and accolades, and exhibiting as art the drawings he had made to serve as storyboards for the film.

The international success of  allowed Kurosawa to proceed with his next project, another epic in a similar vein. The script, partly based on William Shakespeare's King Lear, depicted a ruthless, bloodthirsty daimyō (warlord), played by Tatsuya Nakadai, who, after foolishly banishing his one loyal son, surrenders his kingdom to his other two sons, who then betray him, thus plunging the entire kingdom into war. As Japanese studios still felt wary about producing another film that would rank among the most expensive ever made in the country, international help was again needed. This time it came from French producer Serge Silberman, who had produced Luis Buñuel's final movies. Filming did not begin until December 1983 and lasted more than a year.

She died on February 1. Kurosawa returned to finish his film and  premiered at the Tokyo Film Festival on May 31, with a wide release the next day.

 won several awards in Japan, but was not quite as honored there as many of the director's best films of the 1950s and 1960s had been. Both the producer and Kurosawa himself attributed the failure to even submit  for competition to a misunderstanding: because of the academy's arcane rules, no one was sure whether  qualified as a Japanese film, a French film (due to its financing), or both, so it was not submitted at all. In response to what at least appeared to be a blatant snub by his own countrymen, the director Sidney Lumet led a successful campaign to have Kurosawa receive an Oscar nomination for Best Director that year (Sydney Pollack ultimately won the award for directing Out of Africa). s costume designer, Emi Wada, won the movie's only Oscar.

After s release, Kurosawa would point to it as his best film, a major change of attitude for the director who, when asked which of his works was his best, had always previously answered "my next one".

 Final works and last years (1987–1998) 
For his next movie, Kurosawa chose a subject very different from any that he had ever filmed before. While some of his previous pictures (for example, Drunken Angel and ) had included brief dream sequences, Dreams was to be entirely based upon the director's own dreams. Significantly, for the first time in over forty years, Kurosawa, for this deeply personal project, wrote the screenplay alone. Although its estimated budget was lower than the films immediately preceding it, Japanese studios were still unwilling to back one of his productions, so Kurosawa turned to another famous American fan, Steven Spielberg, who convinced Warner Bros. to buy the international rights to the completed film. This made it easier for Kurosawa's son, Hisao, as co-producer and soon-to-be head of Kurosawa Production, to negotiate a loan in Japan that would cover the film's production costs. Shooting took more than eight months to complete, and Dreams premiered at Cannes in May 1990 to a polite but muted reception, similar to the reaction the picture would generate elsewhere in the world. In 1990, he accepted the Academy Award for Lifetime Achievement. In his acceptance speech, he famously said "I'm a little worried because I don't feel that I understand cinema yet." At the time, Bob Thomas of The Daily Spectrum noted that Kurosawa was "considered by many critics as the greatest living filmmaker."

Kurosawa now turned to a more conventional story with Rhapsody in August—the director's first film fully produced in Japan since Dodeskaden over twenty years before—which explored the scars of the nuclear bombing which destroyed Nagasaki at the very end of World War II. It was adapted from a Kiyoko Murata novel, but the film's references to the Nagasaki bombing came from the director rather than from the book. This was his only movie to include a role for an American movie star: Richard Gere, who plays a small role as the nephew of the elderly heroine. Shooting took place in early 1991, with the film opening on May 25 that year to a largely negative critical reaction, especially in the United States, where the director was accused of promulgating naïvely anti-American sentiments, though Kurosawa rejected these accusations.

Kurosawa wasted no time moving onto his next project: Madadayo, or Not Yet. Based on autobiographical essays by Hyakken Uchida, the film follows the life of a Japanese professor of German through the Second World War and beyond. The narrative centers on yearly birthday celebrations with his former students, during which the protagonist declares his unwillingness to die just yet—a theme that was becoming increasingly relevant for the film's 81-year-old creator. Filming began in February 1992 and wrapped by the end of September. Its release on April 17, 1993, was greeted by an even more disappointed reaction than had been the case with his two preceding works.

Kurosawa nevertheless continued to work. He wrote the original screenplays The Sea is Watching in 1993 and After the Rain in 1995. While putting finishing touches on the latter work in 1995, Kurosawa slipped and broke the base of his spine. Following the accident, he would use a wheelchair for the rest of his life, putting an end to any hopes of him directing another film. His longtime wish—to die on the set while shooting a movie—was never to be fulfilled.

After his accident, Kurosawa's health began to deteriorate. While his mind remained sharp and lively, his body was giving up, and for the last half-year of his life, the director was largely confined to bed, listening to music and watching television at home. On September 6, 1998, Kurosawa died of a stroke in Setagaya, Tokyo, at the age of 88. At the time of his death, Kurosawa had two children, his son Hisao Kurosawa who married Hiroko Hayashi and his daughter Kazuko Kurosawa who married Harayuki Kato, along with several grandchildren. One of his grandchildren, the actor Takayuki Kato and grandson by Kazuko, became a supporting actor in two films posthumously developed from screenplays written by Kurosawa which remained unproduced during his own lifetime, Takashi Koizumi's After the Rain (1999) and Kei Kumai's The Sea is Watching (2002).

Filmography

Although Kurosawa is primarily known as a filmmaker, he also worked in theater and television and wrote books. A detailed list, including his complete filmography, can be found in the list of works by Akira Kurosawa.

 Style, themes and techniques 

Kurosawa displayed a bold, dynamic style, strongly influenced by Western cinema yet distinct from it; he was involved with all aspects of film production. He was a gifted screenwriter and worked closely with his co-writers from the film's development onward to ensure a high-quality script, which he considered the firm foundation of a good film. He frequently served as editor of his own films.

Kurosawa's style is marked by a number of devices and techniques. In his films of the 1940s and 1950s, he frequently employs the "axial cut", in which the camera moves toward or away from the subject through a series of matched jump cuts rather than tracking shots or dissolves. Another stylistic trait is "cut on motion", which displays the motion on the screen in two or more shots instead of one uninterrupted one. A form of cinematic punctuation strongly identified with Kurosawa is the wipe, an effect created through an optical printer: a line or bar appears to move across the screen, wiping away the end of a scene and revealing the first image of the next. As a transitional device, it is used as a substitute for the straight cut or the dissolve; in his mature work, the wipe became Kurosawa's signature.

In the film's soundtrack, Kurosawa favored the sound-image counterpoint, in which the music or sound effects appeared to comment ironically on the image rather than emphasizing it. Teruyo Nogami's memoir gives several such examples from Drunken Angel and Stray Dog. Kurosawa was also involved with several of Japan's outstanding contemporary composers, including Fumio Hayasaka and Tōru Takemitsu.

Kurosawa employed a number of recurring themes in his films: the master-disciple relationship between a usually older mentor and one or more novices, which often involves spiritual as well as technical mastery and self-mastery; the heroic champion, the exceptional individual who emerges from the mass of people to produce something or right some wrong; the depiction of extremes of weather as both dramatic devices and symbols of human passion; and the recurrence of cycles of savage violence within history. According to Stephen Prince, the last theme, which he calls, "the countertradition to the committed, heroic mode of Kurosawa's cinema," began with Throne of Blood (1957), and recurred in the films of the 1980s.

 Legacy and cultural impact 
 Reputation among filmmakers 

Many filmmakers have been influenced by Kurosawa's work. Ingmar Bergman called his own film The Virgin Spring a "touristic... lousy imitation of Kurosawa", and added, "At that time my admiration for the Japanese cinema was at its height. I was almost a samurai myself!" Federico Fellini considered Kurosawa to be "the greatest living example of all that an author of the cinema should be". Steven Spielberg cited Kurosawa's cinematic vision as being important to shaping his own cinematic vision. Satyajit Ray, who was posthumously awarded the Akira Kurosawa Award for Lifetime Achievement in Directing at the San Francisco International Film Festival in 1992, had said earlier of Rashomon: 

Roman Polanski considered Kurosawa to be among the three film-makers he favored most, along with Fellini and Orson Welles, and picked Seven Samurai, Throne of Blood and The Hidden Fortress for praise. Bernardo Bertolucci considered Kurosawa's influence to be seminal: "Kurosawa's movies and La Dolce Vita of Fellini are the things that pushed me, sucked me into being a film director." Andrei Tarkovsky cited Kurosawa as one of his favorites and named Seven Samurai as one of his ten favorite films. Sidney Lumet called Kurosawa the "Beethoven of movie directors". Werner Herzog reflected on film-makers with whom he feels kinship and the movies that he admires:

According to an assistant, Stanley Kubrick considered Kurosawa to be "one of the great film directors" and spoke of him "consistently and admiringly", to the point that a letter from him "meant more than any Oscar" and caused him to agonize for months over drafting a reply. Robert Altman upon first seeing Rashomon was so impressed by the sequence of frames of the sun that he began to shoot the same sequences in his work the very next day, he claimed. George Lucas cited the movie The Hidden Fortress as the main inspiration for his film Star Wars. Zack Snyder cited him as one of his influences for his underdeveloped Netflix film Rebel Moon. Kurosawa was ranked third in the directors' poll and fifth in the critics' poll in Sight & Sound's 2002 list of the greatest directors of all time.

 Criticism 

Kenji Mizoguchi, the acclaimed director of Ugetsu (1953) and Sansho the Bailiff (1954), was eleven years Kurosawa's senior. After the mid-1950s, some critics of the French New Wave began to favor Mizoguchi to Kurosawa. New Wave critic and film-maker Jacques Rivette, in particular, thought Mizoguchi to be the only Japanese director whose work was at once entirely Japanese and truly universal; Kurosawa, by contrast was thought to be more influenced by Western cinema and culture, a view that has been disputed.

In Japan, some critics and filmmakers considered Kurosawa to be elitist. They viewed him to center his effort and attention on exceptional or heroic characters. In her DVD commentary on Seven Samurai, Joan Mellen argued that certain shots of the samurai characters Kambei and Kyuzo, which show Kurosawa to have accorded higher status or validity to them, constitutes evidence for this point of view. These Japanese critics argued that Kurosawa was not sufficiently progressive because the peasants were unable to find leaders from within their ranks. In an interview with Mellen, Kurosawa defended himself, saying, 

From the early 1950s, Kurosawa was also charged with catering to Western tastes due to his popularity in Europe and America. In the 1970s, the politically engaged, left-wing director Nagisa Ōshima, who was noted for his critical reaction to Kurosawa's work, accused Kurosawa of pandering to Western beliefs and ideologies. Author Audie Block, however, assessed Kurosawa to have never played up to a non-Japanese viewing public and to have denounced those directors who did.

 Posthumous screenplays 

Following Kurosawa's death, several posthumous works based on his unfilmed screenplays have been produced. After the Rain, directed by Takashi Koizumi, was released in 1999, and The Sea Is Watching, directed by Kei Kumai, premiered in 2002. A script created by the Yonki no Kai ("Club of the Four Knights") (Kurosawa, Keisuke Kinoshita, Masaki Kobayashi, and Kon Ichikawa), around the time that Dodeskaden was made, finally was filmed and released (in 2000) as Dora-heita, by the only surviving founding member of the club, Kon Ichikawa. Huayi Brothers Media and CKF Pictures in China announced in 2017 plans to produce a film of Kurosawa's posthumous screenplay of The Masque of the Red Death by Edgar Allan Poe for 2020, to be entitled The Mask of the Black Death. Patrick Frater writing for Variety magazine in May 2017 stated that another two unfinished films by Kurosawa were planned, with Silvering Spear to start filming in 2018.

 Kurosawa Production Company 
In September 2011, it was reported that remake rights to most of Kurosawa's movies and unproduced screenplays were assigned by the Akira Kurosawa 100 Project to the L.A.-based company Splendent. Splendent's chief Sakiko Yamada, stated that he aimed to "help contemporary film-makers introduce a new generation of moviegoers to these unforgettable stories".

Kurosawa Production Co., established in 1959, continues to oversee many of the aspects of Kurosawa's legacy. The director's son, Hisao Kurosawa, is the current head of the company. Its American subsidiary, Kurosawa Enterprises, is located in Los Angeles. Rights to Kurosawa's works were then held by Kurosawa Production and the film studios under which he worked, most notably Toho. These rights were then assigned to the Akira Kurosawa 100 Project before being reassigned in 2011 to the L.A. based company Splendent. Kurosawa Production works closely with the Akira Kurosawa Foundation, established in December 2003 and also run by Hisao Kurosawa. The foundation organizes an annual short film competition and spearheads Kurosawa-related projects, including a recently shelved one to build a memorial museum for the director.

 Film studios 
In 1981, the Kurosawa Film Studio was opened in Yokohama; two additional locations have since been launched in Japan. A large collection of archive material, including scanned screenplays, photos and news articles, has been made available through the Akira Kurosawa Digital Archive, a Japanese proprietary website maintained by Ryukoku University Digital Archives Research Center in collaboration with Kurosawa Production. 

 Anaheim University Akira Kurosawa School of Film 
Anaheim University in collaboration with Kurosawa Production and the Kurosawa family established the Anaheim University Akira Kurosawa School of Film in spring 2009. The Anaheim University Akira Kurosawa School of Film offers an Online Master of Fine Arts (MFA) in Digital Filmmaking supported by many of the world’s greatest filmmakers.

 Kurosawa Restaurant Group 

Kurosawa was known to be a connoisseur of Japanese cuisine and as such, the Kurosawa family foundation established the Kurosawa Restaurant Group after his passing in 1999, opening four restaurants in the Tokyo area bearing the family name. Nagatacho Kurosawa specializing in Shabu-shabu, Teppanyaki Kurosawa in Tsukiji specializing in Teppanyaki, Keyaki Kurosawa in Nishi-Azabu specializing in soba, and Udon Kurosawa specializing in udon in Roppongi. All four locations were designed to envoke the Meiji era machiya of Kurosawa's youth and features memorabilia of Kurosawa's career. As of 2023, only the Tsukiji location is currently still operating. A number entrepreneurs around the world have also open restaurants and businesses in honor of Kurosawa without any connection to Akira or the estate. 
 
 Awards and honours 

Two film awards have also been named in Kurosawa's honor. The Akira Kurosawa Award for Lifetime Achievement in Film Directing is awarded during the San Francisco International Film Festival, while the Akira Kurosawa Award is given during the Tokyo International Film Festival.

Kurosawa is often cited as one of the greatest filmmakers of all time. In 1999, he was named "Asian of the Century" in the "Arts, Literature, and Culture" category by AsianWeek magazine and CNN, cited as "one of the [five] people who contributed most to the betterment of Asia in the past 100 years". In commemoration of the 100th anniversary of Kurosawa's birth in 2010, a project called AK100 was launched in 2008. The AK100 Project aims to "expose young people who are the representatives of the next generation, and all people everywhere, to the light and spirit of Akira Kurosawa and the wonderful world he created".

Wes Anderson's animated film Isle of Dogs is partially inspired by Kurosawa's filming techniques. At the 64th Sydney Film Festival, there was a retrospective of Akira Kurosawa where films of his were screened to remember the great legacy he has created from his work.

Kurosawa has also been given a number of state honors, including being named as a officer of the French Légion d'honneur in 1984, a Knight Grand Cross of the Order of Merit of the Italian Republic in 1986, and was the first filmmaker to receive the Order of Culture from his native Japan in 1985. Posthumously, he was recognized with the Junior Third Court Rank, which would be the modern equivalent of a noble title under the Kazoku aristocracy.

 Documentaries 
A significant number of short and full-length documentaries concerning the life and work of Kurosawa were made both during his artistic heyday and after his death. Other documentaries concerning Kurosawa's life and works produced posthumously include:
 Kurosawa: The Last Emperor (Alex Cox, 1999)
 A Message from Akira Kurosawa: For Beautiful Movies (Hisao Kurosawa, 2000)
 Kurosawa (Adam Low, 2001)
 Akira Kurosawa: It Is Wonderful to Create (Toho Masterworks, 2002)
 Akira Kurosawa: The Epic and the Intimate (2010)
 Kurosawa's Way (Catherine Cadou, 2011)

 Notes 

 References 

 Sources 

 
 
 
 
 
 
 
 
 
 
 
 
 
 
 
 
 
 
 
 
 

 Further reading 
 Buchanan, Judith (2005). Shakespeare on Film. Pearson Longman. .
 Burch, Nöel (1979). To the Distant Observer: Form and Meaning in the Japanese Cinema. University of California Press. .
 Cowie, Peter (2010). Akira Kurosawa: Master of Cinema. Rizzoli Publications. .
 Davies, Anthony (1990). Filming Shakespeare's Plays: The Adaptions of Laurence Olivier, Orson Welles, Peter Brook and Akira Kurosawa. Cambridge University Press. .
 Desser, David (1983). The Samurai Films of Akira Kurosawa (Studies in Cinema No. 23). UMI Research Press. .
 
 
 
 
 
 
 Leonard, Kendra Preston (2009). Shakespeare, Madness, and Music: Scoring Insanity in Cinematic Adaptations. Plymouth: The Scarecrow Press. .
 
 
 
 
 
 
 Sorensen, Lars-Martin (2009). Censorship of Japanese Films During the U.S. Occupation of Japan: The Cases of Yasujiro Ozu and Akira Kurosawa. Edwin Mellen Press. .
 
 
 Wild, Peter. (2014) Akira Kurosawa'' Reaktion Books

External links 

 
 
 Akira Kurosawa at The Criterion Collection
 Akira Kurosawa: News, Information and Discussion
 Senses of Cinema: Great Directors Critical Database
 Akira Kurosawa at Japanese celebrity's grave guide 
 
 Several trailers
 Anaheim University Akira Kurosawa School of Film
 

 
1910 births
1998 deaths
20th-century Japanese writers
20th-century male writers
Academy Honorary Award recipients
Akira Kurosawa Award winners
Best Director BAFTA Award winners
César Award winners
David di Donatello winners
Directors Guild of America Award winners
Directors of Best Foreign Language Film Academy Award winners
Directors of Palme d'Or winners
Directors of Golden Lion winners
Filmmakers who won the Best Foreign Language Film BAFTA Award
Fellows of the American Academy of Arts and Sciences
Recipients of the Fukuoka Prize
Japanese film directors
Japanese film editors
Japanese film producers
Japanese male writers
Japanese screenwriters
Kyoto laureates in Arts and Philosophy
Recipients of the Legion of Honour
Male screenwriters
People from Shinagawa
People of the Empire of Japan
People's Honour Award winners
Persons of Cultural Merit
Propaganda film directors
Ramon Magsaysay Award winners
Recipients of the Order of Culture
Recipients of the Order of Friendship of Peoples
Recipients of the Praemium Imperiale
Samurai film directors
Silver Bear for Best Director recipients
Writers from Tokyo
Yakuza film directors